Shararat (Mischief) is a 1944 Hindi comedy film directed by Kishore Sahu. Produced by Hindustan Chitra Productions, it had music by S. N. Tripathi and Khan Mastana.
Following the commercial success of his earlier comedy film Kunwara Baap (1942), Sahu made another comedy with Shararat, which he not only directed and wrote the story for, but also cast himself in the main role. The actors co-starring with him were Maya Banerji, Protima Dasgupta, Ramesh Gupta, Sushil Sahu and Moni Chatterjee.

The film was about a young woman pretending to be insane in order to avoid an arranged marriage.

Plot
Raibahadur Hiralal Mathur is a wealthy man who lives with his wife and a stubborn, spoilt daughter Sudha. Her reckless driving of a new car nearly gets her into trouble when she bangs the car into Dr. Sharma. The Doctor suffers no serious injuries, instead he and Sudha fall in love. However, Sudha's mother has already arranged her marriage into a family of her interest. Sudha pretends to be insane, and the family call for the services of Dr. Sharma to help treat her.

Cast
 Protima Dasgupta
 Kishore Sahu
 Maya Banerji
 Ramesh Gupta
 Sushil Sahu
 Gulab
 Moni Chatterji
 Ranibala

Reception
Shararat was not as well received by the reviewers as Kunwara Baap (1942). Sahu, then thirty years old, was criticised for his looks, with Baburao Patel of Filmindia referring to him as a "tired and prematurely aged young man". Patel also commented on the "poor production" quality and called the film "a poor apology for a comedy".

Soundtrack
The music directors were S. N. Tripathi and Khan Mastana. It had four lyricists, Girish, Ambikesh Kuntal, Rammurti Chaturvedi and A. Karim.

Song List

References

External links

1944 films
1940s Hindi-language films
Films directed by Kishore Sahu
Films scored by S. N. Tripathi
Films scored by Khan Mastana
Indian black-and-white films
Indian comedy films
1944 comedy films
Hindi-language comedy films